Fox Sports Radio is an American sports radio network. Based in Los Angeles, California, the network is operated and managed by Premiere Networks in a content partnership with Fox Corporation's Fox Sports division and iHeartMedia, parent company of Premiere Networks. With studios also in New York, Chicago, Philadelphia, Tampa, Phoenix, Tulsa, Cincinnati, and Las Vegas, Fox Sports Radio is broadcast on more than 400 stations, as well as FoxSports.com on MSN and iHeartRadio.

Clear Channel Communications (now iHeartMedia) sold its stake in Sirius XM Radio in the second quarter of fiscal year 2013. As a result, nine of Clear Channel's eleven XM Satellite Radio stations, including Fox Sports Radio, ceased broadcast over XM on October 18, 2013. Fox Sports Radio returned to the Sirius XM radio lineup on January 20, 2017.

As the network concentrates on sports news, highlights, analysis and opinion at any time of the week, many of its affiliates opt out to air their own local show or provide live coverage of play-by-play games. As a result, several shows that these affiliates simulcast may not be full-length.

Fox Sports Radio local affiliates
This is a partial station listings for local affiliates of Fox Sports Radio.

References

External links

Fox Sports Radio

IHeartMedia
Fox Sports
Franchised radio formats
IHeartRadio digital channels
Radio stations established in 2000
Sports radio networks in the United States
Sirius XM Radio channels